Annie L. Burton ( 1858 – ?) was an African-American memoirist, whose life's story is captured in her 1909 autobiography Memories of Childhood's Slavery Days. Her date of death is uncertain.

Biography
Annie Louise Burton was born into slavery on a plantation near Clayton, Alabama, and was liberated in childhood by the Union Army. Her father was a white man from Liverpool, England, who owned a nearby plantation and died in Lewisville, Alabama, in 1875.

Moving North in 1879, she was among the earliest Black emigrants there from the South during the post-Civil War era, supporting herself in Boston and New York by working as a laundress and as a cook. In her autobiography, published in 1909, Burton relates that the end of slavery not only signaled a time for African Americans to start a new life, but also a time to redefine their lives as she described her own personal journey and how she was able to develop her own identity as an independent person.

Memories of Childhood's Slavery Days 
Annie Burton documented her memories as a young girl in slavery near the end of the Civil War in her 1909 narrative Memories of Childhood's Slavery Days. Her narrative differs from others of the time because she opted to write it herself instead of allowing another author to write it for her.

This narrative is the autobiographical account of Annie Burton as she grows up enslaved in the United States. Burton recounts her life as a child on the plantation she was born on in Alabama. She has relatively pleasant and fond memories of her childhood. She was raised by her mistress after her mom escaped until she eventually returned and took her children back. Eventually, Burton learned how to read and write from her employer as she worked as a nanny. She moved to several different states including Massachusetts, Georgia, and Florida before returning to Boston, Massachusetts, and marrying her husband. In order to broaden her education, Burton attended classes at the Franklin Evening School and, from her learning, was inspired to write her autobiographical slave narrative. Overall, the narrative's focus is mainly on the happier memories of Burton's life as a slave, which differs from other slave narratives of the time that focused instead on the harsh realities and intense violence of being enslaved in the United States.

Burton is included in Margaret Busby's 1992 anthology Daughters of Africa.

Further reading
Burton, Annie L. Memories of Childhood's Slavery Days, Boston: Ross Publishing Company, 1909.
Pierce, Yolanda. "Her refusal to be recast(e): Annie Burton’s narrative of resistance". The Southern Literary Journal 36.2 (2004). Gale Biography in Context. September 13, 2012.
Bolden, Tonya, "Biographies". Digital Schomburg African American Women Writers of the 19th Century (accessed November 18, 2011).

References

External links
 
 
 

1850s births
Year of death missing
19th-century American slaves
African-American writers
American memoirists
American women memoirists
People from Clayton, Alabama
People who wrote slave narratives
19th-century African-American women writers
19th-century American women writers
19th-century African-American writers